Emil Nestved Kornvig (born 28 April 2000) is a Danish professional footballer who plays as a midfielder for  club Cosenza, on loan from Spezia.

Career

Lyngby Boldklub
Kornvig progressed through the Lyngby Boldklub youth academy, before permanently being promoted to the first team in 2020. He tested positive for COVID-19 without symptoms on 23 September 2020 ahead of Lyngby's match against FC Nordsjælland. On 18 January 2021, he signed a contract extension keeping him at the club until 30 June 2024. He suffered relegation to the Danish 1st Division with the club on 9 May 2021 after a loss to last placed AC Horsens.

Spezia
On 26 July 2021 he joined Serie A side Spezia.

Loan to SønderjyskE 
On the same day where he joined Spezia he went to SønderjyskE on loan.

Loan to Cosenza 
On 1 September 2022, Kornvig joined Cosenza on loan with an option to buy.

References

2000 births
People from Gladsaxe Municipality
Sportspeople from the Capital Region of Denmark
Living people
Danish men's footballers
Association football forwards
F.C. Copenhagen players
Lyngby Boldklub players
Spezia Calcio players
SønderjyskE players
Cosenza Calcio players
Danish Superliga players
Danish expatriate men's footballers
Expatriate footballers in Italy
Danish expatriate sportspeople in Italy